, temporarily designated VNH0004, is a trans-Neptunian object from the inner classical part of the Kuiper belt, located in the outermost region of the Solar System.

The object was first observed on 29 May 2011, during the New Horizons KBO Search  conducted by astronomers using the Subaru Telescope at the Mauna Kea Observatory on Hawaii, United States. It was later observed by the New Horizons space probe from afar in January 2015.

Orbit and classification 

 orbits the Sun at a distance of 32.4–42.7 AU once every 229 years and 10 months (83,950 days; semi-major axis of 37.5 AU). Its orbit has an eccentricity of 0.14 and an inclination of 3.6° with respect to the ecliptic.

This object was observed 12 times by the Mauna Kea (8) and Las Campanas (4) observatories over a period of about 33.8 days between 29 May and 2 July 2011. Because of this short period of observation, its current orbit is extremely uncertain.

New Horizons 

While this was too far to resolve surface features or perform spectroscopic analyses of its composition, the spacecraft was able to search for possible satellites and observe its phase curve.

Physical characteristics 

As of 2018, no rotational lightcurve of  has been obtained from photometric observations. The object's rotation period, pole and shape remain unknown.

Numbering and naming 

As of 2018, this minor planet has not been numbered or named.

See also
List of New Horizons topics

References

External links 
 Orbit Fit and Astrometric record for VNH0004, Southwest Research Institute, 25 October 2014
 List of Transneptunian Objects, Minor Planet Center
 Asteroid Lightcurve Database (LCDB), query form (info )
 

Kuiper belt objects
Minor planet object articles (unnumbered)

New Horizons
20110529